, sometimes transliterated Gumpei Yokoi, was a Japanese video game designer. As a long-time Nintendo employee, he was best known as creator of the Game & Watch handheld system, inventor of the cross-shaped Control Pad, the original designer of the Game Boy, and producer of a few long-running and critically acclaimed video game franchises such as Metroid and Kid Icarus.

Career
Yokoi graduated from Doshisha University with a degree in electronics. He was first hired by Nintendo in 1965 to maintain the assembly-line machines used to manufacture its hanafuda cards.

In 1966, Hiroshi Yamauchi, president of Nintendo at the time, came to a hanafuda factory where Yokoi was working and took notice of a toy, an extending arm that Yokoi made for his own amusement during spare time while doing maintenance. Yamauchi ordered Yokoi to develop it as a proper product for the Christmas rush. The Ultra Hand was a huge success, and Yokoi was asked to work on other Nintendo toys, including the Ten Billion Barrel puzzle, a miniature remote-controlled vacuum cleaner called the Chiritory, a baseball-throwing machine called the Ultra Machine, and a "Love Tester". He worked on toys until the company decided to make video games in 1974, when he became one of its first game designers, only preceded by Genyo Takeda. While traveling on the Shinkansen, Yokoi saw a bored businessman playing with an LCD calculator by pressing the buttons. Yokoi then got the idea for a watch that doubled as a miniature video gaming pastime and went on to create Game & Watch, a line of simple LCD animated handheld electronic minigames, which ran from 1980 to 1991 and had 60 variations.

In 1981, Yamauchi appointed Yokoi to supervise Donkey Kong, an arcade game created by Shigeru Miyamoto. Yokoi explained many of the intricacies of game design to Miyamoto at the beginning of his career, and the project only came to be approved after Yokoi brought Miyamoto's game ideas to the president's attention.

After the worldwide success of Donkey Kong, Yokoi continued to work with Miyamoto on the next Mario game, Mario Bros. He proposed the multiplayer concept and convinced his co-worker to give Mario some superhuman abilities, such as the ability to jump unharmed from great heights.

After Mario Bros., Yokoi produced several R&D1 games, such as Kid Icarus and Metroid. He designed R.O.B. and the Game Boy, the latter of which became a worldwide success. Another of his creations, the Virtual Boy, was a commercial failure. Nintendo has denied that the Virtual Boy's poor performance in the market was the reason for Yokoi's subsequent departure from the company, holding that his retirement was "absolutely coincidental" to the market performance of any Nintendo hardware. According to his Nintendo and Koto colleague Yoshihiro Taki, Yokoi had originally decided to retire at age 50 to do as he pleased but had simply delayed it. According to David Sheff's book Game Over, Yokoi never actually intended for the console to be released in its present form. However, Nintendo pushed the Virtual Boy to market so that it could focus development resources on the Nintendo 64.

Amid the failure of the Virtual Boy and the launch of the more successful Game Boy Pocket, Yokoi left Nintendo on 15 August 1996 after thirty-one years at the company. Leaving with several of his subordinates to form a new company called Koto, Yokoi helped create the Tamagotchi and led the development of the Bandai WonderSwan handheld game console.

Lateral Thinking with Withered Technology
Yokoi said "The Nintendo way of adapting technology is not to look for the state of the art but to utilize mature technology that can be mass-produced cheaply." "Withered technology" in this context refers to a mature technology which is cheap and well understood. "Lateral thinking" refers to finding radical new ways of using such technology. Yokoi held that toys and games do not necessarily require cutting-edge technology; novel and fun gameplay are more important. In the interview, he suggested that expensive cutting-edge technology can get in the way of developing a new product.

Game & Watch was developed based on this philosophy. At the time of its development, Sharp and Casio were fiercely competing in the digital calculator market. For this reason, there was a glut of liquid crystal displays and semiconductors. The "lateral thinking" was to find an original and fun use for this cheap and abundant technology. The NES and Game Boy were developed under a similar philosophy. In the handheld market, Yokoi's refusal to adopt a color display for the Game Boy in favor of long battery life is cited as the main reason it prevailed against Sega's Game Gear and Atari's Lynx.

Satoru Iwata, CEO of Nintendo from 2002 until his death in 2015, claimed that this philosophy is still part of Nintendo as it has been passed on to the disciples of Yokoi, such as Miyamoto, and it continues to show itself in Nintendo's then current use of technology with the Nintendo DS handheld system and the highly successful home gaming console, the Wii. The Wii's internal technology is similar to the previous game system's, the GameCube's, and is not as advanced in terms of computational capability and multimedia versatility compared to the competing Xbox 360 and PlayStation 3 consoles. Instead, the system offered something completely different by introducing motion-based controls to the console market in an attempt to change the ways video games are played, and consequently, to widen the audience for video games in general – which it successfully did. This strategy demonstrated Nintendo's belief that graphical advancement isn't the only way to make progress in gaming technology; indeed, after the Wii's overwhelming initial success, Sony and Microsoft released their own motion control peripherals. Nintendo's emphasis on peripherals for the Wii has also been pointed to as an example of Yokoi's "lateral thinking" at work.

Death
On  October 4 1997, Yokoi was riding in a car driven by his associate Etsuo Kiso on the Hokuriku Expressway, when the vehicle rear-ended a truck. After the two men had left the car to inspect the damage, Yokoi was hit and injured by a passing car. The driver of the car that hit Yokoi in the second accident was Gen Tsushima, a member of the tourism industry. Yokoi's death was confirmed two hours later. Kiso suffered only a fractured rib.

Legacy
The title of his main biography from 2010 translates from Japanese as Father of Games – Gunpei Yokoi, the Man Who Created Nintendo's DNA. A 1997 book's title translates to Yokoi's House of Gaming, which was explored in English in 2010 by Tokyo Scum Brigade. A 2014 book about him is Gunpei Yokoi: The Life & Philosophy of Nintendo's God of Toys.

In 2003, Yokoi posthumously received the Lifetime Achievement Award of the International Game Developers Association. GameTrailers placed him on their lists for the "Top Ten Game Creators". An art gallery in Japan created an art exhibit in 2010 titled "The Man Who Was Called the God of Games" featuring all his key Nintendo works. In 1999, Bandai began releasing a series of handheld puzzle games named Gunpey as a tribute to their original creator, Yokoi.

References

External links
Gunpei Yokoi's Lifetime Achievement Award
N-Sider Profile: Gunpei Yokoi
N-Sider: History of R&D 1
Gunpei Yokoi In Memoriam 1941 – 1997
Searching for Gunpei Yokoi 
Twenty Years of the Game Boy – Celebrating Gunpei Yokoi's Genius

1941 births
1997 deaths
People from Kyoto
Road incident deaths in Japan
Nintendo people
Metroid
Japanese video game designers
Japanese inventors
Toy designers
Virtual reality pioneers
Doshisha University alumni
Game Developers Conference Lifetime Achievement Award recipients